Nasrullaganj is a tehsil in Sehore district, Madhya Pradesh, India. It is also a subdivision of the administrative and revenue division of Sehore district of Madhya Pradesh. It is represented in the Madhya Pradesh Legislative Assembly by the Budhni Assembly constituency.

References 

Tehsils of Madhya Pradesh
Sehore district